The rock'n'roll competition at the 2017 World Games took place on 29 July 2017 at the Centennial Hall in Wrocław, Poland.

Competition format
A total of 14 pairs from 14 nations entered the competition. In first round best four pairs qualified directly to the semifinal. In the hope round additional eight pairs are advancing to the semifinal. From semifinal the best six pairs qualifies to the final, where they dance two programmes: foot technique and acrobatic.

Results

First round

Hope round

Semifinal

Final

References 

 
2017 World Games